Breñon is a corregimiento in Renacimiento District, Chiriquí Province, Panama. Its population as of 1990 was 532; its population as of 2000 was 648.

References

Corregimientos of Chiriquí Province